The State Guest House is a historical monument in Hoàn Kiếm District, Hanoi, Vietnam. It is presently used as a state guest house.

The building is representative of French Colonial architecture in French Indochina. It formerly was the Residential palace of the Tonkin Governor, built between 1918 and 1919 to house the French Governor of Tonkin. It was later renamed the Tonkin Palace when the Viet Minh took over northern Vietnam.

History
The palace was built by Auguste Henri Vildieu between 1918 and 1919 to house the French Governor of Tonkin.

The building was the location of Viet Minh's takeover of northern Vietnam, following the August Revolution.

In modern times, it is used as the State Guest House of the Vietnamese Government.

Gallery

See also
Presidential Palace in Ba Đình District, built between 1900 and 1906 to house the French Governor-General of Indochina
Guest house 108 Nguyen Du (Nhà khách 108 Nguyễn Du) in Saigon, was the former state guest house of South Vietnam

References
Notes

Historical sites in Hanoi
Buildings and structures in Hanoi
French colonial architecture in Vietnam
State guesthouses